Azar Mansouri is an Iranian reformist politician.

She is a founding member of the Union of Islamic Iran People Party and the party's secretary-general. She is also a senior member of the Islamic Iran Participation Front. 
Mansouri was a campaigner for the One Million Signatures and considered is among the pioneers of Iranian NGOs working for women's rights. She was disqualified for the 2008 Iranian legislative election and arrested following the post-election protests in 2009.

References 

Living people
1964 births
Islamic Iran Participation Front politicians
Union of Islamic Iran People Party politicians
Iranian city councillors
People from Varamin
Iranian women's rights activists